Cho Dong-chan (born July 27, 1983) is South Korean former professional baseball player, who played 16 seasons with the Samsung Lions of the Korea Baseball Organization. His elder brother Cho Dong-hwa is also a professional baseball player for the SK Wyverns. He represented the South Korea national baseball team at the 2006 and 2010 Asian Games.

External links
 Career statistics and player information from Korea Baseball Organization 
 Roster Info: Cho Dong-chan – Samsung Lions Baseball Team.

References 

1983 births
Asian Games medalists in baseball
Baseball players at the 2006 Asian Games
Baseball players at the 2010 Asian Games
KBO League infielders
Living people
People from Gongju
Samsung Lions players
South Korean baseball players
Asian Games gold medalists for South Korea
Asian Games bronze medalists for South Korea
Medalists at the 2006 Asian Games
Medalists at the 2010 Asian Games
Sportspeople from South Chungcheong Province